Habibabad (also Romanized as Ḩabībābād) is a village in Gowhar Kuh Rural District, Nukabad District, Khash County, Sistan and Baluchestan Province, Iran. At the 2006 census, its population was 122, in 32 families.

References 

Populated places in Khash County